Georgian Airways, formerly Airzena, is the privately owned flag carrier of Georgia, with its headquarters in Tbilisi. Its main base is Tbilisi International Airport. The company filed for bankruptcy on December 31, 2021, linked to a restructuring procedure and it has been for sale since January 2022. The airline continues to operate a limited number of profitable flights during the restructuring phase.

History 

The airline Airzena was established in September 1993. Initially, Airzena operated charter flights to the United Arab Emirates, Italy, China, Egypt, India, and Syria, as well as a regularly scheduled flight to Vienna. The company managed to achieve recognition and retain its share in the aviation market during the economically and politically complicated period of the 1990s.

In 1999 Airzena became the flag carrier of Georgia. In August 2004, the company changed its name to Georgian Airways. During the first half of the 2000s, the airline's management decided to modernise the fleet, and leased two Boeing 737-500s from Hapag-Lloyd. This was the first case of a Georgian airline operating up-to-date Western equipment.

Russian sanctions 
Following what Russia perceived as anti-Russian protests in June 2019, it banned all flights to/from Georgia starting July 8, 2019. Georgian Airways flights to Moscow-Vnukovo have since been operated by Aircompany Armenia through Yerevan. The ban was still in effect by 2023.

Bankruptcy 
Georgian Airways filed for bankruptcy on December 31, 2021, linked to restructuring proceedings, and the airline was put up for sale in January 2022. The causes include the Russian flight ban since July 2019, but most of all the COVID-19 pandemic hit the airline hard. The Georgian authorities banned international air traffic for 11 months, with the exception of a number of monthly government mandated flights for repatriation purposes (operated by Georgian Airways). Georgian Airways cut back on its fleet (such as disposing of its Embraer planes) but with the Georgian resumption of international air traffic in February 2021, it could only offer six destinations.

The insolvency plan focusses on the year-round profitable routes (Amsterdam, Tel Aviv and Minsk) and a few profitable seasonal charters, while guaranteeing these flights. Georgian Airways indicated in January 2022 that it would continue to operate the flights.

Destinations 

As of April 2022, Georgian Airways operates scheduled services from Tbilisi International Airport to destinations in Austria, Israel and Netherlands, while it jointly sells (but not operates) flights to Armenia and France.

Partners
Georgian Airways partners with the following airlines:

 Aeroflot
 Aegean Airlines
 Air Astana
 Air France
 Austrian Airlines
 Azerbaijan Airlines
 Delta Air Lines
 Hahn Air
 Iran Air
 KLM
 Olympic Air
 S7 Airlines
 Transaero
 Ukraine International Airlines

Fleet

Current fleet

The Georgian Airways fleet consists of the following aircraft as of July 2022:

Former fleet
The airline fleet previously included the following aircraft (inconclusive list):

 Boeing 737-300
 Boeing 737-400
 Boeing 737-500
 Boeing 737-800
 Bombardier CRJ100ER
 Embraer 190 
 Embraer 195

Safety rating, accidents and incidents
Georgian Airways has a 7/7 safety rating, the highest level, in AirlineRatings.

On 4 April 2011, United Nations Flight 834, a charter flight for a United Nations mission, operated by a Georgian Airways Bombardier CRJ100ER (registered as 4L-GAE) crashed at N'djili Airport, Kinshasa, Democratic Republic of the Congo, while flying at very low altitude in 'extremely inclement' weather. 32 of the 33 people on board were killed.

References

External links 

 Official website

Airlines established in 2004
Airlines of Georgia (country)
1994 establishments in Georgia (country)
Brands of Georgia (country)